Jamillah Ross is a Canadian comedian, actress, and singer-songwriter.  She trained through Toronto's The Second City and has performed in improvisation troupes and on stage, television and film.  She was in the cast of Show Stopping Number which won a Canadian Comedy Award (CCA) for best improvisational troupe.

Career

Ross started working at Toronto's The Second City comedy club as a server then joined the touring company performing in The Ice Cream Man Cometh and The Puck Stops Here. In May 2003 she returned to Toronto and performed in The Second City's production Armaget-It-On  which was nominated for a Canadian Comedy Award (CCA). Ross later wrote and starred in three consecutive headlining shows on the company's main stage.

In 2006, Ross played Sour Kangaroo in a production of Seussical at the Lorraine Kimsa Theatre for Young People. The following year, she appeared in Show Stopping Number: The Improvised Musical  which won the CCA for best improv troupe.  She was twice nominated for the CCA for best female improvisor. Ross later performed as a member of improv troupe The Dandies.

Ross took part in improvised hidden-camera TV shows Scare Tactics, Howie Do It and Fool Canada. She also had small roles on Toronto-based scripted shows including Flashpoint, Lost Girl, Rookie Blue, Orphan Black, Killjoys, and Kim's Convenience.  She also appeared in the feature films Picture Day and Pay the Ghost.

In 2018, critic Lin Young praised Ross's energy, comedic timing and singing voice in the comedic musical Rumspringa Break!  Ross was also well received in her starring role in the Toronto Fringe Festival production St. Peon Of The People, a walkabout show in which she played a parking enforcement officer leading the audience on Queen Street West, written and directed by Caroline Azar . Ross received an honourable mention for her performance in the play at Toronto's 2019 SummerWorks theatre festival.

Personal life
Ross is married to Sean Fisher  Suga Jam, a Toronto-based comedian, music director and actor.  Her music projects are collaborations with Fisher who also produced Show Stopping Number.

Works

Film
Picture Day (2012) – Gym teacher
Pay the Ghost (2015) – Rhonda
PAW Patrol: The Movie (2021) – Camerawoman
Firestarter (2022) – Officer Pierce

Television
The Toronto Show (2003) – Sassy Neighbour
Popcultured (2005) – herself
Scare Tactics
Mayday (2008)
Howie Do It (2009)
Flashpoint (2009) – Wendy
Orphan Black (2013) – ND Officer
Cracked (2013) – Uniform
Rookie Blue (2014) – Landlady
Lost Girl (2011) – Gladys
Killjoys (2015, 2016) – Delle Seyah's Guard
Beauty & the Beast (2016) – Female announcer
Fool Canada (2015)
The Expanse (2016) – Belter woman
Kim's Convenience (2016, 2017) – Ranisha
Baroness von Sketch Show (2017–2020)
Saving Hope (2017) – Officer Jones
The Good Doctor (2021) – Mildred St. Marry
Chucky (2021)

Stage
Armaget-it-On (2003)
Invasion Free Since 1812 (2005)
Seussical (2006) – Sour Kangaroo
A Freudian Slip of the Jung
Show Stopping Number: The Improvised Musical (2007)
Legs Crossed Hands On Your Lap (2015) – various roles
Falling Angel (2017) – God
Rumspringa Break! (2018) – Cinnamon, other roles
St. Peon of the People (2018–2019) – Officer Rita Mae Nelson

Discography
The Very Best of Love and Death (2002) – vocals
Suga's Last Stand (2008)
It's All About Christmas Time (2014 single)

References

Living people
Actresses from Toronto
Black Canadian actresses
Canadian women singer-songwriters
Canadian singer-songwriters
Canadian women comedians
Comedians from Toronto
Year of birth missing (living people)